Where Are You? I'm Here is a 1993 Italian drama film directed by Liliana Cavani.

The film entered the 50th Venice International Film Festival, where Anna Bonaiuto won the Volpi Cup for best supporting actress. For her role Chiara Caselli was awarded with a Nastro d'Argento for Best Actress and a Grolla d'oro in the same category.

Plot

Fausto's mother refuses to accept the fact that her child is deaf and refuses to send him to a special school where he can learn sign language. His aunt, though, teaches him to communicate and helps him find a place among a group of deaf-mutes. He meets and falls in love with Elena. To their parents' concern, the two find love with each other until a set of difficulties leads them to see their lives in a different light.

Main cast 
Chiara Caselli as Elena Setti
 Gaetano Carotenuto as  Fausto
Anna Bonaiuto as Fausto's Mother
Giuseppe Perruccio as Fausto's Father
Valeria D'Obici as Fausto's Aunt
Ines Nobili as Maria
Ko Muroboshi as The Mime
Doriana Chierici as Elena's Mother
Carla Cassola as Miss Martini
 Paola Mannoni as The Principal
 Pino Micol as The Bank Manager
 Sebastiano Lo Monaco as Professor Pini 
 Paco Reconti as Ugo
 Marzio Honorato as The History Teacher

See also 
 List of Italian films of 1993

References

External links

1993 films
Italian drama films
Films directed by Liliana Cavani
Films scored by Pino Donaggio
Films about deaf people
Italian Sign Language films
1993 drama films
1990s Italian-language films
1990s Italian films